Anton Köszegi (born 31 October 1970) is an Austrian former footballer who played as a forward.

External links
 

1973 births
Living people
Austrian footballers
SV Mattersburg players
Association football forwards